Chavar Kalayeh (also Romanized as Chavar Kalāyeh; also known as Chāpār Kalāyeh) is a village in Reza Mahalleh Rural District, in the Central District of Rudsar County, Gilan Province, Iran. At the 2006 census, its population was 89, in 25 families.

References 

Populated places in Rudsar County